Rohtaed is a novel by Estonian author Karl Ristikivi. It was first published in 1942 by Tartu Eesti Kirjastus.

1942 novels
Novels by Karl Ristikivi